Douglas Leiterman (1927 – 19 December 2012) was a Canadian television producer.

He was born in 1927 in South Porcupine, Ontario. During the early 1950s, he attended the University of British Columbia for a Bachelor of Arts degree, while also working as a Vancouver Province reporter. He had a brother, cinematographer Richard Leiterman, and a sister, Elaine Campbell, who was married to producer Norman Campbell.  His sister Phyllis, a teacher and poet, was married to acclaimed film director Allan King. He had a sister Mary, a teacher and founder of a school, who was married to renowned Ibiza architect and artist Rolph Blakstad.  He attended Harvard University in 1954 on a Nieman Fellowship. Leiterman had five children with his first wife, Mary. He toured Eastern Europe with Mary in 1955.  In 1968 he divorced Mary and married Beryl Fox, who had worked for him at CBC, and had one daughter.  Leiterman got his start in journalism in British Columbia, before becoming a correspondent on Parliament Hill in Ottawa for the Southam News Service.

His television credits include This Hour Has Seven Days which he co-produced with Patrick Watson from 1964 to 1966. It was the second most popular CBC program.  After that series was cancelled, Leiterman joined CBS to provide advice for the development of the 60 Minutes series. He produced a special "Sixteen in Webster Grove" for CBS.

He produced other series such as "The Fabulous Sixties" and Here Come the Seventies (CTV, 1969–1972).  He produced documentaries for the United Nations and a nature film documentary series.

He founded WIred CIty Communications, a cable company in Toronto, in the 1970s.

He founded Motion Picture Guarantors Inc., in the 1970s in Canada and The Motion PIcture Bond Company Ltd., in the 1980s, the second largest completion bond company in the world for motion pictures.  He operated both companies internationally and bonded such films as "Peter The Great" and TV series such as "Baywatch".  He sold MPB to AIG in the early 2000s.

Leiterman died at his winter residence in Vero Beach, Florida on 19 December 2012. He was survived by his partner of 50 years, documentary filmmaker Beryl Fox and their daughter and three of his daughters from his first marriage. He was predeceased by his first wife Mary and two of their five children, Mark and Lisa.

References

External links
 

Canadian television producers
1927 births
People from Timmins
2012 deaths
Canadian Broadcasting Corporation people